is a 2021 Japanese animated film based on the Yuki Midorikawa's manga and anime Natsume's Book of Friends. The film is produced by Shuka and directed by Hideki Itō under the chief direction of Takahiro Omori. It was released in Japan on January 16, 2021.

Plot

Voice cast

Production
The cast of the television series also returned to reprise their roles. Anly perform song Star Wink ~ Star Wink ~.

Release
The film was released in Japan on January 16, 2021. In Japan, the film will be released on Blu-ray and DVD on May 26, 2021. Funimation streamed the film as two OVA episodes.

References

External links 
  
 

Japanese animated films
2020s Japanese-language films
2021 anime films
2021 films
Anime films based on manga
Aniplex
Funimation